Joseph Bryant Smith (December 29, 1826 – March 8, 1862) was an officer in the United States Navy who was killed in action during the American Civil War.

Early life and education
Joseph Bryant Smith was born on December 29, 1826, in Belfast, Maine, Smith was appointed midshipman on October 19, 1841. He was promoted to the rank of lieutenant in 1855, and soon afterwards was assigned to the steam frigate , his station until 1857. Smith next had ordnance duty at the Washington Navy Yard, D.C.

Career
In 1860, he was ordered to frigate  as her first lieutenant.  He was in acting-command of Congress on March 8, 1862, when she was attacked and destroyed by the Confederate ironclad, and lost his life in the action. When his father, Captain Joseph Smith, heard of the surrender of Congress, he said, "Then Joe is dead," feeling that she never would have surrendered while his son lived.

Smith was buried at Oak Hill Cemetery in Washington, D.C.

Legacy
Two ships have been named,  for him.

See also

References

 
 

1826 births
1861 deaths
United States Navy officers
Union Navy officers
People of Maine in the American Civil War
Union military personnel killed in the American Civil War
People from Belfast, Maine
Burials at Oak Hill Cemetery (Washington, D.C.)